The Galloping Kid is a 1922 American silent Western film directed by Nat Ross and featuring Hoot Gibson. It is not known whether the film currently survives.

Cast
 Hoot Gibson as "Simplex" Cox
 Edna Murphy as Helen Arnett
 Lionel Belmore as "FiveasNotch" Arnett
 Léon Bary as Fred Bolston (as Leon Barry)
 Jack Walters as Steve Larabee
 Percy Challenger as Zek Hawkins

See also
 Hoot Gibson filmography

References

External links

 
 

1922 films
1922 Western (genre) films
American black-and-white films
Films directed by Nat Ross
Universal Pictures films
Silent American Western (genre) films
1920s American films
1920s English-language films